The 1924 Mississippi College Choctaws football team was an American football team that represented Mississippi College as a member of the Southern Intercollegiate Athletic Association (SIAA) during the 1924 college football season. In their first year under head coach John M. King, the team compiled a 2–5–1 record.

Schedule

References

Mississippi College
Mississippi College Choctaws football seasons
Mississippi College Choctaws football